7th Magnitude is a record label founded by French record producer Matthieu "Skread" Le Carpentier and co-founder Abdoulaye "Ablaye" Doucouré. The label is known for having signed French rappers Orelsan and Nessbeal.

Activity
7th Magnitude has been instrumental in launching the career of Orelsan, with Skread producing and releasing Perdu d'avance and the hugely successful Le chant des sirènes, which is certified platinum in France. The label has also released Nessbeal's NE2S and Sélection naturelle, as well as singer Isleym's debut studio album Où ça nous mène.

Artists

 Casseurs Flowters
 Gringe
 Orelsan
 Skread
 Celimvn

Releases

References

External links
 

Record labels established in 2006
French record labels
Hip hop record labels
Contemporary R&B record labels